Darlin' was a French rock band formed in 1992 by Laurent Brancowitz, Thomas Bangalter and Guy-Manuel de Homem-Christo. The group released their songs on Stereolab's Duophonic record label. Members of the band went on to successful groups Daft Punk and Phoenix.

Background
Their name was taken from the Beach Boys song of the same name. The group released their songs on Stereolab's Duophonic record label, contained in the Shimmies In Super 8 compilation with Stereolab, Huggy Bear and Colm. In 1995 they appeared on the De La Viande Pour Le Disco? compilation, released by Banana Split. This rare limited edition cassette contained two unreleased Darlin' tracks, named "Untitled 18" and "Untitled 33".

A review in British music magazine Melody Maker called the music "a daft punky thrash." Thus after this short-lived group disbanded, Bangalter and de Homem-Christo created Daft Punk, a successful and world-renowned electronic music project, from 1993 until its later disbandment in 2021. Meanwhile, Brancowitz joined his younger brother Christian Mazzalai in the band Phoenix. The three remained friends, most recently appearing together when Daft Punk made a surprise appearance during the encore of Phoenix's show at Madison Square Garden in October 2010.

Discography
 Shimmies In Super 8 (April 1993, Duophonic) (compilation with Stereolab, Huggy Bear and Colm) – "Cindy So Loud" and "Darlin'"
 De La Viande Pour Le Disco? (1995, Banana Split) (various artists compilation) – "Untitled 18" and "Untitled 33"

References

French indie rock groups
Musical groups established in 1992
Daft Punk
French musical trios